Morvan' may be:

 Morvan, Breton given name and surname, from the Breton Mar (black) and Vand (mountain)

Place:
Morvan
Miniac-Morvan
Baguer-Morvan
Herbularium du Morvan
Alligny-en-Morvan
Ouroux-en-Morvan
Montigny-en-Morvan
Villiers-en-Morvan
Champeau-en-Morvan
Dompierre-en-Morvan
Chissey-en-Morvan
Moux-en-Morvan
Brazey-en-Morvan
Roussillon-en-Morvan
Cussy-en-Morvan
Saint-Hilaire-en-Morvan
La Celle-en-Morvan
Saint-André-en-Morvan

People:
Jean-David Morvan, French comics author 
Augustin Marie Morvan (1819 - 1897), was a French physician, politician, and writer.
Fab Morvan, is a French singer-songwriter, dancer and model.
Françoise Morvan is a French writer who specialises in Breton history and culture.
Joseph Morvan (1924-1999), was a French professional road bicycle racer.
Frères Morvan is a group of traditional singers formed in 1958.
Jean-Baptiste Morvan de Bellegarde

See also
 Morvan's syndrome
88795 Morvan

Surnames of Breton origin
Breton masculine given names